Pedro Manuel Rollán Ojeda (born 21 March 1969) is a Spanish politician who served as acting President of the Community of Madrid between April and August 2019.

From 2007 to 2015 he served as Mayor of Torrejón de Ardoz.

References

1969 births
Living people
People's Party (Spain) politicians
Presidents of the Community of Madrid
Government ministers of the Community of Madrid
Members of the People's Parliamentary Group (Assembly of Madrid)
Members of the 10th Assembly of Madrid
Members of the 11th Assembly of Madrid
Mayors of places in the Community of Madrid
Torrejón de Ardoz